Moondreams may refer to:
 Moondreams (Dick Haymes album)
 Moondreams (Walter Wanderley album)
 "Moondreams" (Norman Petty song)
 "Moon Dreams", a 1942 jazz standard